Gaudius was Archbishop of Split from 1136.

Sources

12th-century Roman Catholic bishops in Croatia
History of Split, Croatia